Catherine ("Cathy") Ann Sulinski (born April 3, 1958, in San Francisco, California) is a retired javelin thrower from the United States. She competed for her native country at the 1984 Summer Olympics, finishing in tenth place (58.38 metres) in the final.

International competitions

References

 
 
 

1958 births
Living people
Track and field athletes from San Francisco
American female javelin throwers
Olympic track and field athletes of the United States
Athletes (track and field) at the 1984 Summer Olympics
Pan American Games medalists in athletics (track and field)
Athletes (track and field) at the 1979 Pan American Games
California State University, Chico alumni
California State University alumni
Pan American Games bronze medalists for the United States
Medalists at the 1979 Pan American Games
21st-century American women